Needler may refer to:
Needler (surname), a surname (and list of people with the name)
Needlegun or needler, a type of firearm
Needler's, an English confectionery company and brand
Needler or the Type-33/Type-56D Guided Munitions Launcher, a fictional weapon in the Halo series